KV Drita is a volleyball club based in Gjilan, Kosovo, founded in 1953. The club was formed on the initiative of the professors and students of a normal school led by Enver Gjinolli.

Name 
In its early years the club was named "Partizani". In 1898 the name was changed to "Akademiku", and in 1977, after a merger with "Tekstil" the club became "Taftison". Finally in 1990 the name was changed to "KV Drita", because all other Gjilan sports teams used this name.

History
After uniting with the "Tekstil" the club became Kosovan champions in the 1980-81 season and ranked highly in the Sixth Federal League of Yugoslavia.

In 1982, Professor Hajrush Fazliu formed a club for women in Selami Hallaqi School in Gjilan, where coaches Hajrush Fazliu, Hafiz Gashi, Shaban Kastrati spotted talent to join KV "Taftison". Over time, they became the most successful volleyball club in Gjilan and Kosovo.

In 1989, events shut down competitions in Yugoslavia. In 1990 competition resumed. In 1997-98 the club was Kosovo champion.

The women's club was Kosovan champion in 1994, 1995 and 1996, and runner up in 1997.

After the Kosovo war 
The men's club was reformed in 2004, and in 2005 and 2007 it was Kosovan champion and in 2009 it was runner-up.

In 2000/01 the women's club was Kosovan runner up. The women's club was Kosovan champion in 2001, 2008, 2009, 2011, 2013, 2014, 2015 and 2016.

Honours

Men

Champions of Kosovo
1997-98, 1997-98 January Club

Women

Champions of Kosovo
1991-92, 1992–93, 1993–94, 1994–95, 1995–96, 1996–97, 1997–98, 2011–12, 2013–14, 20150-16, 2017–18

Team Roster
Women Team - Season 2017–2018, .

Personnel

See also
 2016–17 CEV Women's Champions League
 Sport in Kosovo

References

External links
 Official website
 Live scores and results

Volleyball in Kosovo
Volleyball clubs established in 1947
KV Drita